Heping Road (also known as 1st Avenue) is a major east–west arterial in Taipei, Taiwan. The road is bisected into the East and West segments by Roosevelt Road, with three block sections in each segment. A fourth section in Heping East Road is currently under planning. Heping Road connects Wanhua District to Zhongzheng District in its East and Daan District to Xinyi District in its Eastern segment.

Attractions

Notable attractions on Heping Road include:
China Times Publishing Company
Taipei Botanical Garden
National Taiwan Normal University
Daan Forest Park
National Taipei University of Education

Sections

Heping West Road 
 Section 1 : Roosevelt Road – Quanzhou Street
 Section 2 : Quanzhou Street – Zhonghua Road
 Section 3 : Zhonghua Road – terminates at Huajiang Bridge

Heping East Road 

 Section 1 : Roosevelt Road – Xinsheng Road
 Section 2 : Xinsheng Road – Wolong Street
 Section 3 : Wolong Street – terminates at Zhuangjing Tunnel

See also
 List of roads in Taiwan

References

Streets in Taipei

zh:和平西路